The Ethiopian language area is a hypothesized linguistic area that was first proposed by Charles A. Ferguson (1970, 1976), who posited a number of phonological and morphosyntactic features that were found widely across Ethiopia and Eritrea, including the Ethio-Semitic, Cushitic and Omotic languages but not the Nilo-Saharan languages. 

Others scholars have since pointed out smaller areas of shared features within the larger area (Appleyard 1989, Breeze 1988, Sasse 1986, Tosco 1994, Wedekind 1989).

One of area's most notable features seems to be the use of the verb "say" as an inflected dummy element for an uninflected lexical base (Appleyard 2001, Cohen et al. 2002). Hayward also pointed out patterns of lexicalisation as evidence of a shared linguistic unity across the area (1999, 2000), and Treis noted further examples (2010).

Though Tosco earlier accepted that the area's status had "long been well established" (1994:415), he later challenged Ferguson's work as flawed (2000). He concludes that the Ethiopian language area is not valid and suggests that Ferguson's work reflects the politics of his time, when there was a strong emphasis on Ethiopian unity, as reflected in Donald N. Levine's book Greater Ethiopia: The Evolution of a Multiethnic Society.

Baye Yiman has shown evidence of pragmatic similarities among languages of the Ethiopian language area (1997).

Güldemann has proposed that the use of a generic auxiliary is an area feature that includes Ethiopia but also other languages to its west and northwest. Similarly, Cohen, Simeone-Senelle, and Vanhove have examined the grammaticalised use of "say" and "do" as an area feature of what the scholars call "East Africa".

Wu Tong has examined prenominal relative clauses as an areal feature in the Ethiopian language area.

Tolemariam Fufa Teso has done a broad comparative study of verbal derivation across the area.

The existence of the area is still debated.

Citations

References
 Appleyard, David. 1989. The relative verb in focus constructions: an Ethiopian areal feature. Journal of Semitic Studies 34(2): 291-305.  
 Appleyard, David. 2001. The verb 'to say' as a verb "recycling device" in Ethiopian languages. New Data and New Methods in Afroasiatic Linguistics: Robert Hetzron, in Memoriam, Andrzej Zaborski, ed., 1-11. Wiesbaden: Harrassowitz.  
 Breeze, Mary. 1988. Phonological features of Gimira and Dizi.  In Marianne Bechhaus-Gerst and Fritz Serzisko (eds.), Cushitic - Omotic: papers from the International Symposium on Cushitic and Omotic languages, Cologne, January 6–9, 1986, 473-487. Hamburg: Helmut Buske Verlag.
 Cohen, D., M.-C. Simeone-Senelle and M. Vanhove. 2002. The grammaticalization of 'say' and 'do': An areal phenomenon in East Africa. In T. Güldemann and M. V. Rocador, eds., Reported discourse: a Meeting ground for different linguistic domains, 227-251.  Amsterdam / Philadelphia: John Benjamins.
 Crass, Joachim. 2002. Ejectives and pharyngeal fricatives: Two features of the Ethiopian language area. Ethiopian Studies at the end of the second millennium. Proceedings of the XIVth International Conference of Ethiopian Studies, November 6–11, 2000, Addis Ababa, ed. by Baye Yimam, Richard Pankhurst, David Chapple, Yonas Admassu, Alula Pankhurst, and Berhanu Teferra, 1679–1691. Addis Ababa: Institute of Ethiopian Studies.
 Crass, Joachim and Ronny Meyer (eds.). 2007. Deictics, Copula and Focus in the Ethiopian Convergence Area. (Afrikanistische Forschungen Band XV). Köln: Rüdiger Köppe. 
 Crass, Joachim and Ronny Meyer (eds.). 2009. Language contact and language change in Ethiopia. Köln: Rüdiger Köppe.
 Ferguson, Charles. 1970. The Ethiopian Language Area. The Journal of Ethiopian Studies 8.2: 67-80. 
 Ferguson, Charles.  1976.  The Ethiopian Language Area. Language in Ethiopia, ed. by M. Lionel Bender, J. Donald Bowen, Robert Cooper, Charles Ferguson, pp. 63–76.  Oxford University Press.
 Güldemann, Tom. 2005. Complex predicates based on generic auxiliaries as an areal feature in Northeast Africa. Studies in African linguistic typology, ed. by F. K. Erhard Voeltz, 131-154. Amsterdam/Philadelphia: John Benjamins.
 Hayward, Richard J. 1991. Á propos patterns of lexicalization in the Ethiopian Language Area. In Daniela Mendel and Ulrike Claudi, Ägypten im afroorientalischen Kontext. Special issue of Afrikanistische Arbeitspapiere. Cologne: Institute of African Studies, pp. 139–56.   
 Hayward Richard J. 2000. "Is There a Metric for Convergence." In Colin Renfrew, April McMahon and Larry Trask (eds) Time Depth in Historical Linguistics Vol 2 (Papers in the Prehistory of Languages), 621-640. Cambrdige: The McDonald Institute for Archaeological Research.
 Meyer, Ronny, 2005. Riddles as indicator of cultural and linguistic convergence in the Gurage region: Ethiopia as language and cultural area. Scrinium 1:174-196.
 Sasse, Hans-Jürgen. 1986. A Southwest Ethiopian Language area and its cultural background. In The Fergusonian Impact, vol. 1: From Phonology to Society, ed. by Joshua A. Fishman et al., pp. 327–342. Berlin: Mouton de Gruyter. 
 Tosco, Mauro. 1994. On Case Marking in the Ethiopian Language Area (with special reference to subject marking in East Cushitic), Sem Cam Iafet. Atti della 7ª Giornata di Studi Camito-Semitici e Indeuropei (Milano, 1° giugno 1993). In Vermondo Brugnatelli (a cura di), 225-244. Milano: Centro Studi Camito-Semitici.
 Tosco, Mauro. 1994. The historical syntax of East Cushitic: A first sketch. Perspektiven afrikanistischer Forschung, ed. by Thomas Bearth, Wilhelm J.G Möhlig, Beat Sottas, Edgar Suter, pp. 415–440. Köln: Rüdiger Köppe.
 Tosco, Mauro. 2000.  Is there an Ethiopian Language Area?  Anthropological Linguistics 42:329-365.
 Treis, Yvonne. 2010. Perception verbs and taste adjectives in Kambaata and beyond. In Anne Storch, (ed.), Perception of the Invisible. Religion, Historical Semantics and the Role of Perceptive Verbs (SUGIA – Sprache und Geschichte in Afrika, 21) Cologne: Köppe. pp. 313–346. Article online
 Wedekind, Klaus. 1989. Status and dynamics of Ethiopian vowel systems. Journal of Ethiopian Studies 22: 105-136.
 Wu Tong. 2012. 2012. Prenominal relative clauses in Ethiopian languages: From inside and from outside. Studies in African Linguistics 41.2: 213-252.
 Yiman, Baye. 1997.The pragmatics of greeting, felicitation, and condolence expressions in four Ethiopian languages. African Languages and Cultures 10.2: 103-128.
 Zaborski, Andrzej. 1991. Ethiopian Language Subareas. In Stanislaw Pilaszewicz and Eugeniusz Rzewuski, eds. Unwritten Testimonies of the African Past, (Orientalia Varsoviensia, 2) pp. 123–134.  Warszaw: Wydawnictwa Uniwesytetu Warszawskiego.
 Zaborski, Andrzej. 2010. Language Subareas in Ethiopia Reconsidered. Journal Lingua Posnaniensis 52.2: 99-110.

Further reading
 https://web.archive.org/web/20110719104638/http://cgi.server.uni-frankfurt.de/fb09/ifas/JLCCMS/issues/THEMA_2/06_M_Tosco.pdf

Languages of Ethiopia
Sprachbund